Intraductal papillary mucinous neoplasm (IPMN) is a type of tumor that can occur within the cells of the pancreatic duct. IPMN tumors produce mucus, and this mucus can form pancreatic cysts. Although intraductal papillary mucinous neoplasms are benign tumors, they can progress to pancreatic cancer. As such IPMN is viewed as a precancerous condition. Once an intraductal papillary mucinous neoplasm has been found, the management options include close monitoring and pre-emptive surgery.

Histology
IPMNs are lined with mucin-secreting columnar epithelium.

Diagnosis

In most cases, IPMNs are diagnosed based on clinical and radiographic criteria. If fluid from the cyst is aspirated, the CEA level is typically elevated. Confirmation of the diagnosis with tissue is rarely necessary.

By histopathology, IPMN is characterized on light microscopy by Mucinous epithelial cells, and growth within the pancreatic ducts. Mucin 5AC is a useful immunohistochemistry marker. Characteristic genetic alterations are those of KRAS and GNAS.

Further subtyping of IPMN can be done as either:
Gross pathology: Main duct, branch duct, and mixed duct lesions, which determines surgical management. Main duct lesion is the segmental or diffuse dilatation of main pancreatic duct greater than 5 mm without other causes of obstruction. Meanwhile, branch duct lesion is the pancreatic cyst more than 5 mm that communicates with the main duct. The mixed duct lesions fulfills both criteria above.
By light microscopy and immunohistochemistry: Gastric, intestinal, pancreaticbiliary, and oncocytic.

Treatment
The treatment of choice for main-duct IPMNs is resection due to approximately 50% chance of malignancy. Side-branch IPMNs are occasionally monitored with regular CT or MRIs, but most are eventually resected, with a 30% rate of malignancy in these resected tumors. Indications for surgical resection include obstructive jaundice, an enhancing mural nodule >5 mm, and pancreatic duct dilation (>10 mm). 

Surgery can include the removal of the head of the pancreas (a pancreaticoduodenectomy), removal of the body and tail of the pancreas (a distal pancreatectomy), or rarely removal of the entire pancreas (a total pancreatectomy). In selected cases the surgery can be performed using minimally invasive techniques such as laparoscopy or robotic surgery. A study using Surveillance, Epidemiology, and End Results Registry (SEER) data suggested that increased lymph node counts harvested during the surgery were associated with better survival in invasive IPMN patients.

Prognosis
Survival 5 years after resection of an IPMN without malignancy is approximately 80%, 85% with malignancy but no lymph node spread and 0% with malignancy spreading to lymph nodes.

Epidemiology

Side branch IPMNs are the most common pancreatic cysts. IPMNs occur more often in men than women, and often occur in the 6th and 7th decade of life.

History
In 1982, IPMN was reported as a "mucin-producing tumor" by Kazuhiko Ohashi of the Japanese Foundation for Cancer Research.

See also

Pancreatic serous cystadenoma
Solid pseudopapillary neoplasm

References

External links 

Gastrointestinal cancer
Pancreas disorders
Pancreatic cancer